Sandpoint Reader is a weekly newspaper published in Sandpoint, Idaho, providing local news, cultural and entertainment coverage. It is distributed free in Bonner County, Idaho and Boundary County, Idaho.

History 
The Reader was founded in 2004 by three recent journalism school graduates, Zach Hagadone, John Reuter and Chris DeCleur. The paper suspended publication in 2012 after the three founders departed from Sandpoint. In early 2015, the paper was relaunched by one of its former contributing writers, Ben Olson, as publisher, and Cameron Rasmusson as editor. Olson co-owns the paper with Keokee Co. Publishing, Inc., publisher of the local lifestyle magazine, Sandpoint Magazine.

After four years as editor of the Boise Weekly, Zach Hagadone returned to the Reader and succeeded Rasmusson as editor in 2019. Lyndsie Kiebert is news editor.

In 2017 the Reader produced an eight-week series of in-depth articles and profiles on the American Redoubt with support from the Idaho Press Club.

An investigation in late 2017 by the Reader led to the first public identification of a neo-Nazi activist, Scott Rhodes, who was distributing racist and anti-semitic literature locally and making robocalls targeting high-profile events and political races nationally. The Reader in 2018 was subsequently targeted in harassing and threatening calls, videos and letters. National media including the Washington Post, New York Times and others carried stories on the robocaller after the Reader broke the story. In January 2021, the FCC levied a $9.9 million fine on Rhodes for illegally using caller ID spoofing in making thousands of calls targeting communities with harmful recorded messages.

The Idaho Press Club in its annual awards for 2020 named the Reader journalists for eight awards, including for pandemic and political reporting.

References

External links
Sandpoint Reader website

Newspapers published in Idaho
Newspapers established in 2004
Weekly newspapers published in the United States